Francesco Molin or Francesco Da Molin (21 April 1575 – 27 February 1655) was the 99th Doge of Venice, reigning from his election on 20 January 1646 until his death.  Molin's reign is notable because of Venice's participation in a prolonged war with the Ottoman Empire over Crete; this war was begun during the reign of Molin's predecessor Francesco Erizzo, and dragged on until 1669.  To fund the cost of this war, Molin sold access to the Venetian patriciate at a cost of 100,000 ducats per person.

Background, 1575–1645

The son of Marino Molin and Paola Barbarigo, Francesco Molin was born and died in Venice, and dedicated nearly his entire career to military – and particularly, naval – pursuits.  As such, he served as provveditore of a number of Venetian possessions.  In this, he gained a reputation as a practical and pragmatic man, and one given to diplomacy and compromise.  He was chosen as Procurator of San Marco on his merits; on the outbreak of the Cretan War (1645–1669), he was selected as Captain General of the fleet of the Republic of Venice.  He suffered from gout which rendered him intermittently unable to perform his duties. The Molin family lived at Palazzo Molin, in the San Marco district of Venice.

Reign as Doge, 1646–1655

On 20 January 1646, after 23 ballots and considerable expense, Molin was elected as the 99th Doge of Venice.

During his first years as Doge, Molin strengthened Venetian forces in the area around Venice, and in Dalmatia, hoping to be able to carry the fight to Ottoman territory.  Venice saw a number of victories in these years, climaxing with Venice's capture of Klis Fortress, previously believed to be impregnable, although Venice proved unable to turn this to her strategic advantage.  All of Venice's naval victories were met with fresh Ottoman troops, raised from the vast expanse of the Ottoman Empire.

In an attempt to improve the situation, Venice led a fleet to the Dardanelles, where more Ottoman ships were destroyed, although a decisive Venetian victory still eluded Molin. In the campaigns of 1654 and 1655, Admiral Lazaro Mocenigo blockaded the Dardanelles; Mocenigo was killed during a third attempt, in 1657.

Given Venice's dire straits, it was forced to seek funds wherever it could.  Molin determined to sell access to the Venetian nobility at a price of 100,000 ducats (60,000 ducats as a "gift" to the republic, and another 40,000 as a "loan").  These sales saw a number of new merchant families become Venetian patricians.

Molin died of a calculus on 27 February 1655.

References

This article was based on this article on Italian Wikipedia.

References

1575 births
1655 deaths
Republic of Venice people of the Ottoman–Venetian Wars
16th-century Italian nobility
17th-century Italian nobility
17th-century Doges of Venice
Procurators of Saint Mark